Heiligenstedtenerkamp is a municipality in the district of Steinburg, in Schleswig-Holstein, Germany. It is the municipality with the second longest name in Germany with its 21 characters, behind Gottfriedingerschwaige with its 22 characters.

References

Municipalities in Schleswig-Holstein
Steinburg